The cantilever is a figure skating element. Similar to the spread eagle, the skater travels along a deep edge. With knees bent, the skater bends their back backwards, parallel to the ice.

It was invented by Werner Groebli, better known as "Mr. Frick", a long-time show skater with Ice Follies.  More recently, it became one of Ilia Klimkin's, Elizaveta Tuktamysheva's, Alexandra Trusova's and Shoma Uno's signature moves. Shoma Uno also frequently uses the cantilever in exhibition performances.

Gallery

References
 Figure skating glossary

Figure skating elements